"Loca" is a song by Argentine rapper Khea featuring fellow Argentine rappers Duki and Cazzu. It was released on November 20, 2017. The music video for the song has more than 500 million views on YouTube. The song has over 100 million plays on Spotify.

Background
The song was produced by Omar Varela and MYKKA, the video for the song was directed by Ballve. The song was a trend in various parts of Latin America and Spain and ranked 3 in Argentina. On April 15, 2019, the song was certified Latin Gold by the RIAA.

Personnel
 Khea – lead vocals
 Duki – guest vocals
 Cazzu – guest vocals
 Omar Varela – producer
 Mykka – producer

Bad Bunny remix

The Remix of the song was released on March 16, 2018 and features the Puerto Rican rapper Bad Bunny.
The music video for the song has more than 140 million views on YouTube. The song has over 200 million plays on Spotify.

Charts

Monthly and weekly

Year-end Charts

Certifications

References

2017 singles
2017 songs
Duki (rapper) songs
Songs written by Duki (rapper)
Bad Bunny songs
Songs written by Bad Bunny